Aortopexy is a surgical procedure in which the aortic arch is fixated to the sternum. It results in the tracheal lumen being pulled open. It is used to treat severe tracheomalacia or tracheal compression.

The procedure was originally proposed as a treatment for tracheomalacia Filler et al. in 1976.

References

Aortopexy for the treatment of tracheomalacia in children

Surgical approaches to aortopexy for severe tracheomalacia 

Vascular surgery